Argizala is a genus of insect in family Gryllidae.

Taxonomy
The Orthoptera Species File database lists the following species:
Argizala brasilensis Walker, 1869
Argizala hebardi (Rehn, 1915)

References

Ground crickets